Mesa para tres ("Table for Three") is a 2004 Colombian telenovela produced and broadcast by Caracol TV.

Plot
Luis and Alejandro Toro arrive with their mother to Bogotá, after escaping their home town, where they owned a restaurant. In Bogotá they get a job at Zavatti, a high-class restaurant. Both Luis and Alejandro meet and fall in love with Andrea Zavatti, who is the daughter of Harold Zavatti, the owner of the restaurant. George Brown, who is Andrea's boyfriend, tries to get rid from the Toro brothers, as he is only interested in Mr Zavatti's fortune. Luis is kidnapped and thought dead, Andrea and Alejandro get together and, when Luis appears again, feels betrayed by Alejandro.

Cast
Héctor Arredondo as Luis Toro
Diego Cadavid as Alejandro Alejo Toro
Catalina Aristizábal as Andrea Zavatti
Daniel Ochoa as George Brown
Mayte Vilan as Blanca Patricia Melo
Myriam de Lourdes as Rita
Clemencia Guillén as Tía Martha
Patricia Grisales as Leonor Torres "Leito"
Álvaro Rodríguez as Francisco Paco
Luis Fernando Múnera as Justo Gamarra
Yuli Ferreira as Violeta Gamarra
Sandra Guzmán as Marta Consuelo Sandoval
Anderson Balsero as Lalo
Germán Quintero as Harold Zavatti
María Cristi Gálvez as Victoria Stevens de Brown
Estefanía Borge as Kathy Noguera
Álvaro Bayona as Teniente Abril
Astrid Junguito as Fidelina Torres
Manolo Orjuela as Farfán
Orlando Valenzuela as Ramón Tavernero
Carlos Hurtado as Guillermo Flórez
Santiago More as Gerardo Pinzón
Valentina Rendón as Claudia
Tania Fálquez as Tte. Ángela Barrera
Daniel Rocha as Carmelo Sepúlveda
Andrés Toro as Andrés
Genoveva Caro as Martha
Felipe Noguera  as Daniel

Theme song
The song used as theme song	was the 1981 hit Te quiero para mí, by Spanish group Trigo Limpio.

International broadcasting
The series was sold to several networks in Latin America, including Venezuela's RCTV. In 2007, ClubIT Arena bought the rights to offer a subtitled version of Mesa para tres on its website in Japan, under the title Andrea, ai to ryakudatsu no honoo (アンドレア〜愛と略奪の炎). It was divided in 4 "seasons" (3 of 30 episodes each, and one of 28 episodes).

MyNetworkTV telenovelas

Mesa para tres was the basis for the 2006 MyNetworkTV telenovela Desire.  Changes were made in the location and the plot to make them more palatable to Americans.  The serial was known as Table for Three and Three's a Crowd before its debut.  The show was filmed at Stu Segall Productions in San Diego, using 25 principal actors, 250 supporting actors and about 2,000 extras. Ratings for Desire fell below expectations.  The debut scored a 2.0 rating and the first week averaged an 0.8 rating and 1 share. It averaged a 0.4 rating in the adult 18-49 demographic., falling to a 0.3 in its second week. However, the show was sold to several international markets.

References

External links
  Caracol TV International catalogue
  アンドレア〜愛と略奪の炎, Mesa para tres, with Japanese subtitles.
 

2004 telenovelas
2004 Colombian television series debuts
2004 Colombian television series endings
Colombian telenovelas
Caracol Televisión telenovelas
Spanish-language telenovelas
Television shows set in Bogotá